Walton Township may refer to:

 Walton Township, Harvey County, Kansas
 Walton Township, Labette County, Kansas, in Labette County, Kansas
 Walton Township, Sumner County, Kansas, in Sumner County, Kansas
 Walton Township, Eaton County, Michigan
 Walton Township, Washington County, Missouri

Township name disambiguation pages